MP36 can refer to:

 A prototype of the MP 40 submachine gun
 A variant of the MPI MPXpress passenger locomotive
 A Megatron action figure released as number 36 of the Transformers Masterpiece toyline released by Takara Tomy.